Gary George may refer to:
Gary George (Oregon politician), state senator from the U.S. state of Oregon from 1997 to 2009
Gary George (Wisconsin politician) (born 1954), state senator from the U.S. state of Wisconsin from 1981 to 2003

See also
Gary Georges (born 1953), Haitian sprinter